The NASA Outstanding Service Medal, now obsolete, was to be awarded to US government employees only for notably outstanding service which affected technical or administrative programs of NASA.

See also 
Awards and decorations of the United States government

External links
 NASA awards
 National Aeronautics and Space Administration Honor Awards (1969-1978)

Outstanding Leadership Medal